The Bloody Ploughman is a domesticated apple cultivar. The cultivar originated in Scotland.

Characteristics

The cavity is deep, narrow, is mostly lined with russet which can spread out over the shoulder.
The stalk is sturdy.
 The basin varies, but is ribbed and irregular.
 The eye is open or partly open.
 The sepals are broad and reflexed.
 The flesh is pink when ripe, sweet, juicy and crisp.
 The tube is broad cone, the stamens are basal and the core is situated away from the axis.
 The tree is vigorous.
 The season is September to November.
 The flowering is just before Cox's Orange Pippin. Pollination Group D.
 On May 8, it is 10% flowering.
 On May 12, it is full (80%) flowering.
 On May 19, it has 90% petal fall.
Picking time: mid-September.

Name

The story is that a gamekeeper shot dead a ploughman caught stealing apples from the Megginch Estate. When his body was returned to his wife, she found stolen apples in his pockets and threw them onto a rubbish heap. One of the resulting seedlings bore apples of a deep, blood red. This tree gave rise to the cultivar that was named after the unfortunate ploughman.

References

External links and references

 A photo of the inside of a Bloody Ploughman

Apple cultivars
British apples